190-192 Sloane Street, also known as the Sekers Building, is a grade II listed building on Sloane Street, London at the junction with Harriet Street.

Design
The building was designed by the architects Brett and Pollen, primarily partner Harry Teggin, for the Cadogan Estate, and completed in 1965. The interiors were designed by Dennis Lennon, with fittings by the sculptor Robert Adams, but do not survive.

Sekers era
The ground floor showrooms were originally occupied by Sekers Fabrics, the British fabric manufacturer founded by Nicholas Sekers.

The company, based in Whitehaven, Cumbria,  was awarded the Duke of Edinburgh prize for elegant design in 1962, 1965 and 1973, and a Royal warrant was awarded as suppliers of furnishing fabric to Her Majesty the Queen. In 1964, they established their London showroom at 190-192 Sloane Street.

References

Modernist architecture in London
Commercial buildings completed in 1965
International style architecture in England
Buildings and structures in the Royal Borough of Kensington and Chelsea
Knightsbridge